is the third Jewelpet anime television series created by Sanrio and Sega. It began airing on TV Tokyo between April 9, 2011 and March 31, 2012 on TV Tokyo. The series focuses on the main heroines Kanon Mizushiro and Ruby, who attend Sunshine Academy as part of the Class 3 Plum Section.

Episode list

References

General
 http://www.tv-tokyo.co.jp/anime/jp-sunshine/

Specific

Sunshine